

Arthropoda

Newly named insects

Archosauromorphs

Newly named dinosaurs

Plesiosaurs

New taxa

Synapsids

Non-mammalian

References

1860s in paleontology
Paleontology
Paleontology 8
Paleontology, 1868 In